Peqin railway station serves the town of Peqin in Elbasan County, Albania.

Peqin was the terminus of Albania's first passenger railway line. The 27-mile route was completed with assistance from the Socialist Federal Republic of Yugoslavia, but completion was delayed after the final shipment of 1,700 tons of rails did not arrive promptly from Zenica. After Nako Spiru made repeated requests to the Belgrade administration, the shipment arrived at Durrës on 12 October 1947, but was not unloaded for three days.

Peqin remained the terminus of the line until 23 February 1949 when the line was extended to Tirana.

References

Railway stations in Albania
Railway stations opened in 1947